FC ViOn Zlaté Moravce – Vráble is a Slovak football team, based in the town of Zlaté Moravce. The club was founded on 22 January 1995.

History

From the club's establishment in 1995 until 2004, they played in various regional competitions. In 2004 they were promoted to the Slovak Second Division, and then in the 2006–07 season were promoted to the Corgoň Liga, and won the Slovak Cup, beating FC Senec 4–0. This earned them place in the first qualifying round of the 2007–08 UEFA Cup.

Zlaté Moravce played their first European match on 19 July 2007 in the UEFA Cup at home against Alma-Ata, winning 3–1. On 2 August 2007, they have tied in Almaty 1–1, qualifying to the second qualification round.

Events timeline
 1995 – Founded as FC ViOn Zlaté Moravce
 2016 – Renamed FC ViOn Zlaté Moravce – Vráble

Honours

Domestic
 Slovak Cup (1961–)
  Winners (1): 2006–07
 Slovak Second Division (1993–)
  Winners (2): 2006–07, 2009–10

Affiliated clubs
The following clubs are affiliated with FC ViOn:
  São Bernardo Futebol Clube (2017–)
  SPAL (2019–present)

Sponsorship

Club partners
source

ViOn
Hydina Súlovce
Kameň Slovakia

KTL
Nitrazdroj
Novoprint

Svet minerálov
Slovanet
Financie Complet

Current squad

 

For recent transfers, see List of Slovak football transfers winter 2022-23.

Out on loan

Management staff

Source:

Results

League and Cup history
Slovak League only (1993–present)
{|class="wikitable"
! style="color:#12242D; background:#B9191E;"| Season
! style="color:#12242D; background:#B9191E;"| Division (Name)
! style="color:#12242D; background:#B9191E;"| Pos./Teams
! style="color:#12242D; background:#B9191E;"|Slovak Cup
! style="color:#12242D; background:#B9191E;" colspan=2|Europe
! style="color:#12242D; background:#B9191E;"|Top Scorer (Goals)
|-
|align=center|2000–01
|align=center|3rd (2. Liga)
|align=center bgcolor=green|1
|align=center|Did not enter
|align=center|
|align=center|
|align=center|  Jozef Piaček (11)   Róbert Michalík (11)
|-
|align=center|2001–02
|align=center|2nd (1. Liga)
|align=center bgcolor=red|16/(16)
|align=center|Preliminary round
|align=center|
|align=center|
|align=center|?
|-
|align=center|2002–03
|align=center|3rd (2. Liga)
|align=center |10
|align=center|Did not enter
|align=center|
|align=center|
|align=center|?
|-
|align=center|2003–04
|align=center|3rd (2. Liga)
|align=center bgcolor=green|2
|align=center|Did not enter
|align=center|
|align=center|
|align=center|  Juraj Vondra (18)
|-
|align=center|2004–05
|align=center|2nd (1.Liga)
|align=center|8/(16)
|align=center|Quarter-finals
|align=center|
|align=center|
|align=center|  Peter Černák (6)
|-
|align=center|2005–06
|align=center|2nd (1.Liga)
|align=center |8/(16)
|align=center |Round 1
|align=center|
|align=center|
|align=center|  Peter Černák (5)   Martin Chren (5)
|-
|align=center|2006–07
|align=center|2nd (1.Liga)
|align=center bgcolor=green|3/(12)
|align=center bgcolor=gold|Winner
|align=center|
|align=center|
|align=center|  Marek Plichta (9)
|-
|align=center|2007–08
|align=center|1st (Corgoň Liga)
|align=center|11/(12)
|align=center|Round 3
|align=center|UC
|align=center|Q2 ( Zenit St. Petersburg)
|align=center|  Peter Černák (4)
|-
|align=center|2008–09
|align=center|1st (Corgoň Liga)
|align=center bgcolor=red|12/(12)
|align=center|Quarter-finals
|align=center|
|align=center| 
|align=center|  Salomon Wisdom (4)
|-
|align=center|2009–10 
|align=center|2nd (DoxxBet Liga)
|align=center bgcolor=green|1/(14)
|align=center|Round 3
|align=center|
|align=center|
|align=center|  Karol Pavelka (16)
|-
|align=center|2010–11
|align=center|1st (Corgoň Liga)
|align=center |6/(12)
|align=center |Semi-finals
|align=center| 
|align=center|
|align=center|  Peter Kuračka (7)
|-
|align=center|2011–12
|align=center|1st (Corgoň Liga)
|align=center|7/(12)
|align=center|Semi-finals
|align=center| 
|align=center| 
|align=center|  Martin Hruška (6)
|-
|align=center|2012–13
|align=center|1st (Corgoň Liga)
|align=center|8/(12)
|align=center|Round 3
|align=center| 
|align=center| 
|align=center|  Andrej Hodek (13)
|-
|align=center|2013–14
|align=center|1st (Corgoň Liga)
|align=center|10/(12)
|align=center|Quarter-finals
|align=center|
|align=center|
|align=center|  Martin Pribula (8)
|-
|align=center|2014–15
|align=center|1st (Fortuna Liga)
|align=center|10/(12)
|align=center |Round 5
|align=center|
|align=center|
|align=center|  Martin Juhar (4)   Márius Charizopulos (4)
|-
|align=center|2015–16
|align=center|1st (Fortuna Liga)
|align=center|9/(12)
|align=center|Quarter-finals
|align=center| 
|align=center|
|align=center|  Leandre Tawamba (11)
|-
|align=center|2016–17
|align=center|1st (Fortuna Liga)
|align=center |10/(12)
|align=center|Round 4
|align=center| 
|align=center|
|align=center|  Peter Orávik (5)
|-
|align=center|2017–18
|align=center|1st (Fortuna Liga)
|align=center |10/(12)
|align=center |Round 3
|align=center| 
|align=center| 
|align=center|   Róbert Gešnábel (9)
|-
|align=center|2018–19
|align=center|1st (Fortuna Liga)
|align=center |10/(12)
|align=center|Round of 16
|align=center| 
|align=center| 
|align=center|  Tomáš Ďubek (9)
|-
|align=center|2019–20
|align=center|1st (Fortuna Liga)
|align=center|8/(12)
|align=center |Semi-finals
|align=center| 
|align=center| 
|align=center|  Tomáš Ďubek (8)
|-
|align=center|2020–21
|align=center|1st (Fortuna Liga)
|align=center|5/(12)
|align=center|Quarter-finals
|align=center| 
|align=center| 
|align=center|  Filip Balaj (16)
|-
|align=center|2021–22
|align=center|1st (Fortuna Liga)
|align=center|11/(12)
|align=center|Quarter-finals
|align=center| 
|align=center| 
|align=center|  Tomáš Ďubek (7)
|}

European competition history

Youth program

The club is also particularly known for its youth program. Academy name is PFA (Požitavská futbalová akadémia).

Player records

Most goals

Players whose name is listed in bold are still active.

Notable players
Had international caps on senior level for their respective countries. Players whose name is listed in bold represented their countries while playing for FC ViOn.

Past (and present) players who are the subjects of Wikipedia articles can be found here.

 Stefan Cebara
 Martin Dobrotka
 Tomáš Ďubek
 Martin Fabuš
 Mohd Irfan Fazail
  Miloš Glonek
 Tomche Grozdanovski
 Wan Zack Haikal
 Dominik Holec
 Tomáš Hubočan
 Jésus Konnsimbal
 Tihomir Kostadinov
 Pavel Kováč
 Štefan Maixner
 Pavol Majerník
 Lamin Samateh
 Fadhli Shas
 Milan Škriniar
 Michal Škvarka
 Léandre Tawamba
 Marek Ujlaky
 Egy Maulana Vikri
 Salomon Wisdom

Managers

 Ján Rosinský (-2004)
 Anton Dragúň (2004 – 2006)
 Ľubomír Moravčík (1 July 2008 – 30 Nov 2008)
 Štefan Horný (1 Dec 2008 – 5 Oct 2009)
 Juraj Jarábek (5 Oct 2009 – 30 May 2013)
 Branislav Mráz (May 2013 – June 2015)
 Milko Djurovski (15 June 2015 – 23 Aug 2015)
 Libor Fašiang (23 Aug 2015 – 23 May 2016)
 Peter Gergely (23 May 2016 – 6 Nov 2016)
 Juraj Jarábek (6 Nov 2016 – 5 Nov 2018)
 Branislav Mráz (car.) (5 Nov 2018 – 13 Dec 2018)
 Karol Praženica (13 Dec 2018 – 30 June 2020)
 Branislav Mráz (car.) (1 July 2020 – 11 July 2020)
 Ľuboš Benkovský (11 July 2020 – 5 May 2022)
 Ján Kocian (5 May 2022 – 4 Oct 2022)
 Ivan Galád (5 Oct 2022 – ongoing)

References

External links
Official website 
 

 
ViOn
Association football clubs established in 1995
1995 establishments in Slovakia